Celal Kıprızlı (born 28 April 1950) is a Turkish football manager.

References

1950 births
Living people
Turkish football managers
Giresunspor managers
Çaykur Rizespor managers
Göztepe S.K. managers
Kayseri Erciyesspor managers
Kardemir Karabükspor managers
MKE Ankaragücü managers